A collar-and-elbow hold is a stand-up grappling position where both combatants have a collar tie, and hold the opponent's other arm at the elbow. Generally the opening move in professional wrestling, the collar-and-elbow is generally a neutral position, but by pushing the hand on the elbow to the inside of the opponent's arms, and holding the biceps, more control can be obtained. From here it will be easier to strike or to attempt takedowns, while defending against the opponent's techniques.

See also
 Bear hug
 Double collar tie
 Double underhooks
 Pinch grip tie
 Over-under position

References

External links
 John Danaher and Renzo Gracie, Two Approaches to Fighting in the Clinch

Grappling positions
Wrestling
Professional wrestling moves